Star is a rural locality (a village) in Maryovsky District of Novgorod Oblast, Russia.

References

Sources

Rural localities in Novgorod Oblast